Augusto Armellini was an Italian politician. He was acting mayor of Rome from July 1880 to October 1881. He was mayor of Rome, Kingdom of Italy from 1889 to 1890.

References

19th-century Italian politicians
Mayors of Rome